1 Decembrie 1918 is a metro station located in southeastern Bucharest on Line M3. It is on the Linia de Centură branch of the Bucharest Metro and was opened on 20 November 2008 as part of the extension from Nicolae Grigorescu to Linia de Centură (now Anghel Saligny). Initially, a shuttle started operating between Nicolae Grigorescu and Linia de centura. The regular operation started on 4 July 2009. It serves the neighbourhoods of southern Titan, 1 Decembrie Ozana and Trapezului.

References

Bucharest Metro stations
Railway stations opened in 2008
2008 establishments in Romania